The 39th International Film Festival of India was held in Panaji, Goa from 22 November 2008 to 1 December 2008.

Winners
  

Golden Peacock (Best Film):  "Tulpan" by "Sergey Dvortsevoy"
Silver Peacock Special Jury Award: Malani Fonseka for the film "Akasa Kusum"
Silver Peacock Award for the Most Promising Asian Director: "Sergey Dvortsevoy" for the film "Tulpan"

Jury
Niki Karimi         
Tabassum Hashmi
Marco Mueller
Lav Diaz
Peter Ho-Sun Chan

In competition
The competition section had 15 films including
My Mother's Tears
Rupant
The Shaft
Kanchivaram
Mahasatta
The Song of Sparrows
The Red Spot
Tulpan 
Pensil
Ploning
Akasa Kusum
The Coffin

References

2008 film festivals
2008 festivals in Asia
39
2008 in Indian cinema